Echinoderes is a genus of mud dragons first described in 1863. It is the largest genus within class Kinorhyncha. It is a highly diverse genus, with member species that inhabit "most marine benthic substrates, on latitudes ranging from the Arctic to the tropics, and from the intertidal zone down to the deep sea." Species on the east coasts of North and South America have been extensively studied by Robert P. Higgins. Species in east Asia have been extensively studied by A. V. Adrianov.

Members of Echinoderes are sexually dimorphic.

Species 
Over 75 species are accepted within Echinoderes:

 Echinoderes abbreviates Higgins, 1983
 Echinoderes agigens Bacescu, 1968
 Echinoderes andamanensis Higgins & Rao, 1979
 Echinoderes angustus Higgins & Kristensen, 1988
 Echinoderes applicitus Ostmann, Nordhaus & Sørensen, 2012
 Echinoderes aquilonius Higgins & Kristensen, 1988
 Echinoderes arlis Higgins, 1966
 Echinoderes aspinosus Sørensen, Rho, Min, Kim & Chang, 2012
 Echinoderes augustae Sørensen & Landers, 2014
 Echinoderes aureus Adrianov, Murakami & Shirayama, 2002
 Echinoderes bengalensis  (Timm, 1958)
 Echinoderes bermudensis Higgins, 1982
 Echinoderes bispinosus Higgins, 1982
 Echinoderes bookhouti Higgins, 1964
 Echinoderes brevicaudatus Higgins, 1977
 Echinoderes canariensis Greeff, 1869
 Echinoderes cantabricus Pardos, Higgins & Benito, 1998
 Echinoderes capitatus  (Zelinka, 1928)
 Echinoderes caribiensis Kirsteuer, 1964
 Echinoderes cavernus Sørensen, Jörgensen & Boesgaard, 2000
 Echinoderes cernunnos Sørensen, Rho, Min, Kim & Chang, 2012
 Echinoderes citrinus Zelinka, 1928
 Echinoderes collinae Sørensen, 2006
 Echinoderes coulli Higgins, 1977
 Echinoderes dujardinii Claparède, 1863
 Echinoderes ehlersi Zelinka, 1913
 Echinoderes elongatus  (Nyholm, 1947)
 Echinoderes eximus Higgins & Kristensen, 1988
 Echinoderes ferrugineus Zelinka, 1928
 Echinoderes filispinosus Adrianov, 1989
 Echinoderes gerardi Higgins, 1978
 Echinoderes gizoensis Thormar & Sørensen, 2010
 Echinoderes higginsi Huys & Coomans, 1989
 Echinoderes hispanicus Pardos, Higgins & Benito, 1998
 Echinoderes horni Higgins, 1983
 Echinoderes imperforatus Higgins, 1983
 Echinoderes intermedius Sørensen, 2006
 Echinoderes isabelae GaOrdóñez, Pardos & Benito, 2008
 Echinoderes kanni Thormar & Sørensen, 2010
 Echinoderes koreanus Adrianov, 1999 in Adrianov & Malakhov, 1999
 Echinoderes kozloffi Higgins, 1977
 Echinoderes krishnaswamyi Higgins, 1985
 Echinoderes kristenseni Higgins, 1985
 Echinoderes lanceolatus Chang & Song, 2002
 Echinoderes levanderi Karling, 1955
 Echinoderes malakhovi Adrianov, 1999 in Adrianov & Malakhov, 1999
 Echinoderes maxwelli  (Omer-Cooper, 1957)
 Echinoderes microaperturus Sørensen, Rho, Min, Kim & Chang, 2012
 Echinoderes multisetosus Adrianov, 1989
 Echinoderes neospinosus GaOrdóñez, Pardos & Benito, 2008
 Echinoderes newcaledoniensis Higgins, 1967
 Echinoderes obtuspinosus Sørensen, Rho, Min, Kim & Chang, 2012
 Echinoderes ohtsukaii Yamasaki & Kajihara, 2012
 Echinoderes pacificus Schmidt, 1974
 Echinoderes parrai GaOrdóñez, Pardos & Benito, 2008
 Echinoderes pennaki Higgins, 1960
 Echinoderes peterseni Higgins & Kristensen, 1988
 Echinoderes pilosus Lang, 1949
 Echinoderes remanei (Blake, 1930)
 Echinoderes rex Lundbye, Rho & Sørensen, 2011
 Echinoderes riedli Higgins, 1966
 Echinoderes sensibilis Adrianov, Murakami & Shirayama, 2002
 Echinoderes setiger  (Greeff, 1869)
 Echinoderes skipperae Sørensen & Landers, 2014
 Echinoderes spinifurca Sørensen, Heiner & Ziemer, 2005
 Echinoderes stockmani Adrianov, 1999 in Adrianov & Malakhov, 1999
 Echinoderes subfuscus Zelinka, 1928
 Echinoderes sublicarum Higgins, 1977
 Echinoderes svetlanae Adrianov, 1999 in Adrianov & Malakhov, 1999
 Echinoderes tchefouensis Lou, 1934
 Echinoderes teretis Brown, 1999 in Adrianov & Malakhov, 1999
 Echinoderes truncatus Higgins, 1983
 Echinoderes tubilak Higgins & Kristensen, 1988
 Echinoderes ulsanensis Adrianov, 1999 in Adrianov & Malakhov, 1999
 Echinoderes wallaceae Higgins, 1983
 Echinoderes worthingi Southern, 1914

References

Kinorhyncha
Animals described in 1863